Frantic Films Corporation is a Canadian branded content and live action production company based in Winnipeg, Manitoba. Frantic Films is known for producing live action reality shows, documentaries and for its work in feature film visual effects.

History
Frantic Films was founded in 1997 by Ken Zorniak and Chris Bond. The company initially produced work for commercial clients such as Procter & Gamble and created computer-generated imagery (CGI) for Stephen King's Storm of the Century.

In 2001, Frantic Films attracted international attention after creating stunning visual effects sequences for the blockbuster film Swordfish. Also in 2001, Frantic Films founded a research and development division that focussed on creating software and tools for future visual effects projects. The division produced a large suite of in-house and commercial software. Early efforts were focused on Deadline (a commercial render farm management tool) and Flood (an in-house fluid simulation tool). In 2004, Flood was said to be one of the top three fluid simulation tools in the world.

In 2002, Jamie Brown joined Frantic Films as a partner.

In 2007, the visual effects and software R&D divisions were acquired by the Prime Focus Group. As a result, Frantic Films stopped all visual effects and previsualization projects and refocused on live action and branded content. In 2010, the Frantic Films co-founder Chris Bond started a new company called Thinkbox Software and reacquired the software R&D division back from Prime Focus Group. Thinkbox Software has since been acquired by Amazon Web Services and most of the commercial software launched by Frantic Films remains in active development.

In 2009, Frantic Films acquired Red Apple Entertainment, enabling rights over Red Apple's syndication catalog and mode of production.

In 2017, the special-purpose acquisition company, Kew Media Group, spent $108 million buying Canadian production companies, among them Bristow Global Media, Our House Media and Frantic Films. in 2020, Brown financed a deal for Frantic Films to buy back its shares from  Kew Media Group.

Branded content
The branded content division, Frantic Branded Content, specializes in creating original integrated entertainment for traditional and emerging media platforms. In 2009, Frantic Branded Content partnered with the advertising agency TAXI and commercial the production company Soft Citizen to produce the branded entertainment television property Commercial Break.

Live action (past and current)
 High Maintenance
 Stand!
 Killer in Plain Sight 
 Into Invisible Light
 The Writers' Block
 The Stats of Life
 Indictment: The Crimes of Shelly Cartier
 Backyard Builds
 Baroness von Sketch Show
 Still Standing
 Meet the Family
 Winnipeg Comedy Festival
 Buy It, Fix It, Sell It
 Pitch'n In
 Todd and the Book of Pure Evil
 A pitchn' In Christmas
 Verdict
 Til Debt Do Us Part
 Keep Your Head Up Kid: The Don Cherry Story
 Breakbound
 Devil's Brigade
 Guinea Pig
 Music Rising
 Retail
 Princess
 Of All Places

Visual effects and previsualization (past)
Alien: Resurrection (1997) – visual effects contributed to DVD release
Swordfish (2001) – visual effects
The Italian Job (2003) – previsualization, visual effects
X2 (2003) – previsualziation, visual effects
Paycheck (2003) – visual effects
The Core (2003) – visual effects
Resident Evil: Apocalypse (2004) – visual effects
Catwoman (2004) – previsualziation, visual effects
Scooby-Doo 2: Monsters Unleashed (2004) – visual effects
Cursed (2005) – visual effects
Poseidon (2006) – previsualization
X-Men: The Last Stand (2006) – previsualziation
Superman Returns (2006) – visual effects, software development
Mr. Magorium's Wonder Emporium (2007) – visual effects
Journey to the Center of the Earth (2008) – visual effects
Runaway (2009) – visual effects

References

External links
 Frantic Films  official website
 Thinkbox Software
 Commercial Break news release 

Companies based in Winnipeg
Special effects companies
Visual effects companies
Film production companies of Canada
Television production companies of Canada
Cinema of Manitoba